The Vaganova Academy of Russian Ballet is a school of classical ballet in St Petersburg, Russia. Established in 1738 during the reign of Empress Anna, the academy was known as the Imperial Ballet School until the Soviet era, when, after a brief hiatus, the school was re-established as the Leningrad State Choreographic Institute. In 1957, the school was renamed in honor of the pedagogue Agrippina Vaganova, who cultivated the method of classical ballet training that has been taught there since the late 1920s. Many of the world's leading ballet schools have adopted elements of the Vaganova method into their own training.

The Vaganova Academy is the associate school of the Mariinsky Ballet, one of the world's leading ballet companies. Students of the school have found employment with ballet and contemporary companies worldwide, such as the Bolshoi Ballet, The Royal Ballet, American Ballet Theatre and the Mikhailovsky Ballet.

History
The school was established as the Imperial Theatrical School by decree of the Empress Anna on 4 May 1738 with the French Ballet Master Jean-Baptiste Lande as its director. The first classes occupied empty rooms in the Winter Palace in St. Petersburg and the first students were twelve boys and twelve girls.  

Nearly all the early teachers at the school were from Western Europe, including Franz Hilferding and Giovanni Canzianni. The first Russian teacher to join the school was Ivan Valberg.  After the spread of ballet in Europe, the development of the school was influenced by a number of other teachers and methods, including Christian Johannson, a student of August Bournonville, and the Italian methods of Enrico Cecchetti, Pierina Legnani and Carlotta Brianza.  Other renowned 19th-century dancers and ballet masters who taught at and were influential in the development in the school include Charles Didelot, Jules Perrot, Arthur Saint-Léon, Lev Ivanov, Marius Petipa and Mikhail Fokine.

Since 1836, the school has been situated at 2 Rossi Street in St. Petersburg (known as Leningrad after 1924 until the collapse of the Soviet Union). The Imperial Ballet School was dissolved by the new Soviet government, but later re-established on the same site as the Leningrad State Choreographic School. The Imperial Russian Ballet was also dissolved and re-established as the Soviet Ballet. The company was later renamed the Kirov Ballet following the assassination of Sergey Kirov in 1938.  Despite later being given the current name Mariinsky Ballet, the company is still commonly known as the Kirov Ballet.

Vaganova

Agrippina Vaganova brought developments in modern Russian Ballet.  She graduated from the Imperial Ballet School in 1897 and danced with the Imperial Ballet, retiring from the stage early to pursue her teaching career following the Revolution.  As the Soviet government had not yet re-established the school, Vaganova began her teaching career at the privately owned School of Russian Ballet, eventually joining the new Leningrad State Choreographic School in 1920.  Vaganova is noted for authoring The Principles of Classical Dance, which outlines the training system she created. There are a number of variations in the name of the school, but the official title in current use in the English-speaking world is Vaganova Ballet Academy.

Today

Overview
The Vaganova Ballet Academy which some consider the source of modern ballet is now over 275 years old. The Academy has over 300 students. The Rector of the academy is Nikolay Tsiskaridze and the Artistic Director is  Zhanna Ayupova.

Auditions
Auditions for the school begin in June, and children must be at least 10 years to audition.

Training
All students at the school begin by studying a program of dance training, secondary school level education, French language and piano lessons.  As they progress through the school, the program becomes more intensive, with new subjects being added to the curriculum as the students become more advanced. Students are evaluated at the end of each academic year and a decision made as to whether they will advance to the higher grades which have progressively fewer openings.

Notable graduates 

Ji-Young Kim
Altynai Asylmuratova
Zhanna Ayupova
George Balanchine
Mikhail Baryshnikov
Vakhtang Chabukiani
Alexandra Danilova
Natalia Dudinskaya
Mikhail Fokine
Elizaveta Gerdt
Yuri
 Grigorovich
Tamara Karsavina
Irina Kolpakova
Gabriela Komleva
Ekaterina Kondaurova
Mathilde Kschessinska
Nicolai Legat
Serge Legat
Larissa Lezhnina
Ulyana Lopatkina
Natalia Makarova
Yulia Makhalina
Ryan Martin
Varvara P. Mey
Galina Mezentseva 
Fethon Miozzi 
Olesya Novikova
Bronislava Nijinska
Vaslav Nijinsky
Rudolf Nureyev
Valery Panov
Yelena Pankova
Veronika Part
Anna Pavlova
Olga Preobrajenskaya
Evgenia Obraztsova
Farukh Ruzimatov
Marina Semenova
Konstantin Sergeyev
Vladimir Shklyarov
Alla Sizova
Olga Smirnova
Yuri Soloviev
Alina Somova
Olga Spesivtseva
Yulia Stepanova
Viktoria Tereshkina
Galina Ulanova
Anastasia Volochkova
Diana Vishneva
Rostislav Zakharov
Svetlana Zakharova
Konstantin Zaklinsky
Igor Zelensky
Valentin Elizariev
Maria Khoreva
Ai-gul Gaisina 
Lisa Macuja-Elizalde

References

External links 

  
  
 Photo-essay: Vaganova Ballet Academy

Ballet schools in Russia
History of ballet
Ballet in Saint Petersburg
Universities and colleges in Saint Petersburg
Cultural heritage monuments of federal significance in Saint Petersburg